Suibne or Suibhne, a Gaelic male name from which the modern Sweeney is derived, may refer to:

 Suibne mac Colmáin (died c. 598), Irish king
 Suibne Menn (died c. 628), Irish king
 Suibne moccu Fir Thrí (died c. 657), abbot of Iona
 Suibne son of Maclume (died c. 891), famed scribe of Clonmacnoise
 Suibne mac Cináeda (died 1034), King of the Gall Gaidheil
 Suibne Geilt ("Sweeney the Wild"), protagonist of the Irish language tale Buile Shuibhne (The Madness of Sweeney)
 Suibhne mac Duinnshléibhe, early 13th century Scottish magnate, eponym of Castle Sween and the MacSweens of Argyll and Ireland